The Indianapolis Sailing Club is a private yacht club located in Indianapolis, Indiana, on the shore of Geist Reservoir (US).

History 
In November 1954, a group of sailors gathered to discuss the possibility of organizing a sailing club on the Geist Reservoir, created by the Indianapolis Water Company in 1943. The group met regularly during the next months to formulate a constitution, by-laws, a set of strict safety rules, and legal documents to lease land from the Indianapolis Water Company for a clubhouse site and docking facilities. On February 24, 1955, a 10-year lease with the Indianapolis Sailing Association granting the use of around 13 acres of land and sailing privileges on Geist Reservoir was signed. On June 19, 1955, a grand opening was held on the present clubhouse grounds. The original classes of sailboats at ISC were Snipes, Lightnings, Thistles and Y flyers. On March 11, 1957, at the annual meeting, ISC members voted to change the name to Indianapolis Sailing Club.

Fleets 
The ISC is home of the following One-Design racing fleets:
MC Scow Fleet #103
Sunfish Fleet 
Laser Fleet  #24
Snipe Fleet #409
Melges 17 Fleet #9
Thistles Fleet #69
Y flyer Fleet #8
Interlake Fleet #28
Lightning Fleet #270
Ice boat Fleet
Portsmouth Fleet

References

External links 
 Official website

1955 establishments in Indiana
Sailing in Indiana
Yacht clubs in the United States